Karate was competed by men and women at the 1998 Asian Games in Rangsit Sports Complex, Bangkok, Thailand. Kata was contested along with Kumite. There were 11 gold medals contested for this sport. All competition took place on December 15, 16 and 17.

Medalists

Men

Women

Medal table

References
 Results

External links 
 Olympic Council of Asia

 
1998 Asian Games events
1998
Asian Games
1998 Asian Games